Veselin Đurasović (born 7 January 1957 in Mostar) is a Bosnian-Herzegovinian former football player, from the late 1970s and the 1980s and currently, football coach.

Playing career
Đurasović played for Velež from 1974 to 1990. He played 17 seasons for Velež. Over 400 official games, out of that, 304 games in the Yugoslav First League. He is only one of four players that played over 300 games in the league, those being: Enver Marić, Franjo Vladić and Dušan Bajević. He was also the club captain in 26 games. He scored 2 goals for Velež in the league.

He debuted for the club on 8 October 1975 against GNK Dinamo Zagreb in Mostar. He is one of the few who won both Yugoslav Cups, although he did not appear in the final in 1986 against Dinamo Zagreb because of an injury.

According to the estimates of the then famous Yugoslav magazine "Sport", he was named the best "number five". At that time, he played as a libero, and he was among the best on that position at that time.

Žarko Barbarić, former coach of Velež, had only words of praise for Đurasović: "A very grateful player. His rich experience and responsibility in the game are precious. Each coach and a team would want such a player and a man. A fighter without any flaw and fear. Where others wouldn't set a foot, he would a head", while former teammate, Predrag Jurić said: "Đurasović is a real man and a footballer. A big friend! Always ready to joke, but on the ground an example of how to fight for club and how to perform professional duties."

He played his last match for Velež on 16 May 1990 against Dinamo in Mostar, thus closing the circle of fate to debut against Dinamo and to finish his playing career against the Zagreb team.

Officially, the farewell was on the 1991 February tournament, in which Red Star Belgrade, Željezničar Sarajevo, and Dinamo Zagreb took part.

Coaching career
One time, he was sitting on the Velež bench as an assistant to the head coach. In 2010 he was the caretaker manager of Velež. Most recently, he trained the youth team of Velež from 2015 to 2017.

He is currently serving as a representative of the club in the matches of the First League of the FBiH, as well as in the games of the youth selections.

Honours

Player
Velež Mostar 
Yugoslav Cup: 1980–81, 1985–86
Balkans Cup: 1980–81

References

1957 births
Living people
Sportspeople from Mostar
Association football defenders
Yugoslav footballers
FK Velež Mostar players
Yugoslav First League players
Bosnia and Herzegovina football managers
FK Velež Mostar managers
Premier League of Bosnia and Herzegovina managers